Põrmujärv is a lake northwest of Voru City, in the county of Voru in Estonia's south, close to the border with Latvia.

See also
List of lakes of Estonia

Lakes of Estonia
Võru Parish
Lakes of Võru County